Juan Ramón Escalas (born 2 December 1976) is a Spanish retired footballer and padbol player.

Scotland
Tied to a one-year deal with Partick Thistle until 2005, Escalas had what was seen as a sublime performance on debut, grabbing two goals to overwhelm Brechin 3–0. He went on to reach six goals in his first five games, including strikes at Airdrie, before putting two goals past Ross County later in October. Setting 20 goals as his 2004–05 objective, the Spaniard finished the season with 11 (league) but had to return to Spain to be with his severely sick mother.

He took English classes with a personal teacher while in Scotland.

References

External links 
 Juan Alberto Ramón: "Hoy puede ser un gran día, lo sé" 
 Juan Alberto Ramón: "Espero poder ir pronto para celebrar el nuevo ascenso" 
 BDfutbol Profile
 Lapreferente.com Profile
 

1976 births
Living people
Spanish footballers
Association football forwards
Spanish expatriate footballers
Expatriate footballers in Scotland
Spanish expatriate sportspeople in Scotland
RCD Mallorca B players
Atlético Madrid B players
UE Lleida players
Elche CF players
CD Leganés players
Talavera CF players
Partick Thistle F.C. players
Granada CF footballers